Baboua may refer to: 

Baboua, Central African Republic
Baboua, Cameroon